The Device Forts, also known as Henrician castles and blockhouses, were a series of artillery fortifications built to defend the coast of England and Wales by Henry VIII. They ranged from large stone castles, to small blockhouses and earthwork bulwarks. Armed with artillery, the forts were intended to be used against enemy ships before they could land forces or attack vessels lying in harbour. The castles were commanded by captains appointed by the Crown, overseeing small garrisons of professional gunners and soldiers, who would be supplemented by local militia in an emergency. The Device programme was hugely expensive, costing a total of £376,000, much of it raised from the proceeds of the Dissolution of the Monasteries.

The fate of the Device Forts over the coming years varied. Some of the defences were left to deteriorate and were decommissioned only a few years after their construction. Others were kept in service and used during the English Civil War, the Anglo-Dutch Wars, the Napoleonic Wars and, upgraded with more modern artillery and defences, throughout the 19th century. By 1900, however, developments in guns and armour had made most of the Device Forts that remained in service simply too small to be practical in modern coastal defence. Despite being brought back into use during the Second World War, by the 1950s those fortifications still in use were considered redundant and finally decommissioned. Coastal erosion over the centuries had extensively damaged or completely destroyed some sites, but others have been restored and opened to the public as tourist attractions.

Details

Notes

References

Bibliography
 
 
 
 
 
 
 
 
 
 
 
 
 
 
 
 
 
 
 
 
 
 
 
 
 
 
 
 
 
 
 
 
 
 
 
 
 
 
 
 
 
 
 
 
 
 
 
 

16th-century fortifications
Device Forts
1540 establishments in England